Phiri is a township in the urban area of Soweto in South Africa. The township was founded in 1956, as part of the demographic reorganization started by the state that year. Phiri, along with several other areas, was created to house Sotho and Tswana-speakers. Phiri is the Sotho word for hyena.

The town is also famous for the birthplace of South African international footballer Siphiwe Tshabalala.

References

External links
 History of Soweto

Johannesburg Region D
Soweto Townships